German submarine U-58 was a Type IIC U-boat of Nazi Germany's Kriegsmarine that served in the Second World War. She was produced by Deutsche Werke AG, Kiel. Ordered on 17 June 1937, she was laid down on 29 September as yard number 257. She was launched on 12 October 1938 and commissioned on 4 February 1939 under the command of Oberleutnant zur See Herbert Kuppisch.

Design
German Type IIC submarines were enlarged versions of the original Type IIs. U-58 had a displacement of  when at the surface and  while submerged. She had two shafts and two  propellers.

U-58 was fitted with three  torpedo tubes at the bow, five torpedoes or up to twelve Type A torpedo mines, and a  anti-aircraft gun. The boat had a complement of 25.

Service history
U-58 was initially assigned to the 5th U-boat Flotilla during her training period, until 31 December 1939, when she was reassigned to the 1st U-boat Flotilla for a front-line combat role. U-58 carried out twelve war patrols, sinking seven ships for a total .

For the test the schnorchel replaced the aft periscope. The initial trial was successful and a collapsible schnorchel forward of the bridge was envisaged for Type VIIC boats.

First, second and third patrols
U-58s first three patrols, completed during her workup and training period, were uneventful cruises in the North Sea. No ships were attacked during this period.

Fourth patrol
The submarine's luck changed for the better on New Year's Day 1940. Two days later the 2,475 GRT Svartön, also Swedish flagged, was sunk at  while traveling with convoy HN-6.

Fifth and sixth patrols
U-58s fifth patrol was really only a six-day transit from Kiel to Wilhelmshaven. Her sixth patrol began from the latter port on 27 January 1940. On 3 February, at 09.36 hours, the only success of this patrol occurred when the small 815 GRT Estonian merchantman Reet was sunk with a single torpedo. Two previous shots earlier in the day had missed their mark (02.15 and 04.52 hours respectively). There were no survivors.

Seventh patrol
The U-boat's seventh patrol was an unsuccessful 34-day foray in the waters between Scotland and Norway. The boat returned to Kiel on 3 May 1940.

Eighth patrol

Ninth patrol
The veteran submarine's ninth patrol saw her headed for a new home port in Lorient, France. Command was assumed by Oblt.z.S. Heinrich Schonder, who remained in charge of the boat for the rest of her career. Along the way, the 1,591 GRT Norwegian steam merchant Gyda was sunk by a single torpedo. This was a rather bold attack, given that the ship was being escorted by a Sunderland flying boat, a well known U-boat killer.

Tenth patrol
Departing Lorient on 29 July 1940, U-58 headed north toward Ireland, where she sank the 4,360 GRT Greek merchant ship Pindos (a straggler from convoy SL-40), on 4 August with two torpedoes. The patrol terminated at Lorient on 12 August 1940.

Eleventh patrol
The U-boat's eleventh patrol was uneventful and she was transferred to a new home port, Bergen in Norway. En route, she attacked and sank the 4,956 GRT British merchantman Confield, a straggler from convoy HX 76. Although not sunk by the torpedo hit, the abandoned derelict was later shelled and sunk by the British sloop .

Twelfth patrol
U-58 departed Bergen on 14 October 1940 for her final patrol, a transit back to Kiel. There she was transferred to the 22nd U-boat flotilla for service as a training boat. She remained in this role under various commanders for the rest of the war. She was eventually scuttled at Kiel on 3 May 1945 to keep her out of the hands of the advancing Allies. The wreck was subsequently raised and broken up for scrap.

Summary of raiding history

References

Notes

Citations

Bibliography

External links

German Type II submarines
U-boats commissioned in 1939
World War II submarines of Germany
1938 ships
Ships built in Kiel
Operation Regenbogen (U-boat)
Maritime incidents in May 1945